Robert W. "Crock" Parker Jr. (June 15, 1912 – June 7, 1984) was an American football and track coach. He served as the head football coach at Southwest Texas State College—now known as Texas State University–from 1954 to 1959, compiling a record of 30–17–3. Parker was also the head track coach and an assistant football coach at Stephen F. Austin State University in Nacogdoches, Texas.

Parker attended North Texas Agricultural College—now known as the University of Texas at Arlington–where he played football, basketball, and baseball. He was a teammate in all three sports with his brother, Buddy Parker, who went on to coach in the National Football League (NFL) and Jack Gray, who became the head basketball coach at the University of Texas at Austin.

Head coaching record

Football

References

External links
 

1912 births
1984 deaths
American football ends
Centenary Gentlemen football players
Stephen F. Austin Lumberjacks football coaches
Texas–Arlington Mavericks football players
Texas State Bobcats football coaches
UT Arlington Mavericks baseball players
UT Arlington Mavericks men's basketball players
College track and field coaches in the United States
High school football coaches in Texas
People from Kaufman County, Texas
Coaches of American football from Texas
Players of American football from Texas
Baseball players from Texas
Basketball players from Texas